On the Edge is a 2011 German-Moroccan-French drama film directed by Leïla Kilani.

The film was awarded a Honorable Mention by the SIGNIS Award during the Cordoba African Film Festival 2012.

References

External links 

2011 drama films
2011 films
French drama films
German drama films
Moroccan drama films
2010s French films
2010s German films